Robert Volodymyrovych Hehedosh (born 2 May 1993) is a Ukrainian footballer who plays as a forward for Maltese side St. Lucia.

Biography

Metalist Kharkiv
In 2011, he signed a contract with Metalist Kharkiv. He made his debut against Beregvidek Berehove on 21 September in the 2011–12 Ukrainian Cup.

Peremoha Dnipro
In 2022 he moved to Peremoha Dnipro in the Ukrainian Second League.

St. Lucia
In January 2023 he moved to St. Lucia in the Maltese Premier League.

Honours

Club

Meteor Pistryalovo
 Zakarpattia Oblast Championship: 2013

Mynai
 Zakarpattia Oblast Championship: 2017
 Zakarpattia Oblast Cup: 2017, 2018
 Zakarpattia Oblast Supercup: 2017

Veres Rivne
 Ukrainian First League: 2020–21

Pyunik
 Armenian Premier League: 2021–22

Individual
 Ukrainian Amateur League top scorer: 2017–18
 Ukrainian Second League Player of the Season: 2018–19
 Ukrainian Cup top scorer: 2018–19, 2020–21 (shared)

References

External links
 
 

1993 births
Living people
People from Svaliava
Piddubny Olympic College alumni
Ukrainian footballers
Ukrainian expatriate footballers
Expatriate footballers in Slovakia
Ukrainian expatriate sportspeople in Slovakia
Expatriate footballers in Poland
Ukrainian expatriate sportspeople in Poland
FC Metalist Kharkiv players
FC Kremin Kremenchuk players
FC Hoverla Uzhhorod players
FC Mynai players
FC Uzhhorod players
FC Metalist 1925 Kharkiv players
NK Veres Rivne players
FC Peremoha Dnipro players
Górnik Polkowice players
FC Pyunik players
St. Lucia F.C. players
Ukrainian Premier League players
Ukrainian First League players
Ukrainian Second League players
5. Liga players
I liga players
Ukrainian people of Hungarian descent
Armenian Premier League players
Maltese Premier League players
Expatriate footballers in Armenia
Ukrainian expatriate sportspeople in Armenia
Expatriate footballers in Malta
Ukrainian expatriate sportspeople in Malta
Association football forwards
Ukrainian Cup top scorers
Sportspeople from Zakarpattia Oblast